Iran participated in the 2002 Asian Games held in the city of Busan. This country is ranked 10th with 8 gold medals in this edition of the Asiad.

Competitors

Medal summary

Medal table

Medalists

Results by event

Aquatics

Water polo

Men

Archery

Men's recurve

Athletics

Men

Women

Canoeing

Men

Women

Cycling

Mountain bike

Men

Road

Men

Track

Men

Equestrian

Jumping

Football

Men

Judo

Men

Karate

Men's kumite

Shooting

Men

Women

Taekwondo

Men

Women

Volleyball

Indoor

Men

Weightlifting

Men

Wrestling

Men's freestyle

Men's Greco-Roman

Wushu

Men's taolu

Men's sanda

References

External links
  Iran Olympic Committee - Asian Games Medalists
  Iran National Sports Organization - Asian Games Medalists

Nations at the 2002 Asian Games
2002
Asian Games